The Charities Act 2006 (c 50) is an Act of the Parliament of the United Kingdom intended to alter the regulatory framework in which charities operate, partly by amending the Charities Act 1993. The Act was mostly superseded by the Charities Act 2011, which consolidates charity law in the UK.

Provisions
The Act contains three main provisions: definition of the requirements to qualify as a charity, the establishment of a Charity Tribunal to hear appeals from decisions of the Charity Commission, and alterations to the requirements for registering charities.

Charitable status 
The Act imposes conditions on bodies wishing to attain or maintain charitable status.

For the purposes of the law, a charitable organisation must demonstrate that it serves the public interest, and that its purpose lies entirely in the promotion of one or more of the following causes:
 the prevention or relief of poverty;
 the advancement of education;
 the advancement of religion;
 the advancement of health or the saving of lives;
 the advancement of citizenship or community development;
 the advancement of the arts, culture, heritage or science;
 the advancement of amateur sport;
 the advancement of human rights, conflict resolution or reconciliation or the promotion of religious or racial harmony or equality and diversity;
 the advancement of environmental protection or improvement;
 the relief of those in need by reason of youth, age, ill-health, disability, financial hardship or other disadvantage;
 the advancement of animal welfare;
 the promotion of the efficiency of the armed forces of the Crown, or of the efficiency of the police, fire and rescue services or ambulance services;
 Any other purposes under ss4 of the 2006 act

Prior to 2008, the law assumed that advancement of education or religion were automatically in the public interest. A "public benefit" now needs to be demonstrated.

Charity Tribunal
The Act established a "Charity Tribunal" to hear appeals from decisions of the Charity Commission, which previously lay only to the High Court.  The Tribunal was abolished in September 2009 and its functions transferred to the First-tier Tribunal.

Registration
The Act raises the threshold above which registration is required with the Charity Commission from £1,000 to £5,000.  This is intended to reduce administration costs for small charities.  In addition, charities which fall under certain exempted categories under the 1993 Act (such as certain Christian denominations) are now only exempted if their gross annual income is less than £100,000.

Section 79 - Commencement
The following orders have been made under section 79(2):
The Charities Act 2006 (Commencement No. 1, Transitional Provisions and Savings) Order 2007 (S.I. 2007/309 (C. 13))
The Charities Act 2006 (Commencement No. 2, Transitional Provisions and Savings) Order 2007 (S.I. 2007/3286 (C. 135))
The Charities Act 2006 (Commencement No. 3, Transitional Provisions and Savings) Order 2008 (S.I. 2008/751 (C. 32))
The Charities Act 2006 (Commencement No. 4, Transitional Provisions and Savings) Order 2008 (S.I. 2008/945 (C. 46))
The Charities Act 2006 (Commencement No. 4, Transitional Provisions and Savings) (Amendment) Order 2009 (S.I. 2009/841 (C. 55))
The Charities Act 2006 (Commencement No. 5, Transitional and Transitory Provisions and Savings) Order 2008 (S.I. 2008/3267 (C. 150))
The Charities Act 2006 (Commencement No. 5, Transitional and Transitory Provisions and Savings) (Amendment) Order 2010 (S.I. 2010/1942 (C. 103))
The Charities Act 2006 (Commencement No. 6 and Commencement No. 5, Transitional and Transitory Provisions and Savings (Amendment)) Order 2009 (S.I. 2009/2648 (C. 118))
The Charities Act 2006 (Commencement No. 7, Transitional and Transitory Provisions and Savings) Order 2010 (S.I. 2010/503 (C. 36))

See also
Exempt charity
English trusts law

Notes

External links
Charity commission briefing on the Act

UK Legislation 

Explanatory notes to the Charities Act 2006.

United Kingdom Acts of Parliament 2006
English trusts law
Charity law
Charity in the United Kingdom